The High Academy of the Quechua Language (Spanish: Academia Mayor de la Lengua Quechua; Quechua: Qhichwa Simi Hamut'ana Kuraq Suntur) or AMLQ is a Peruvian organization dedicated to the research, promotion, and dissemination of the Quechua language.

History 
In 1954 Faustino Espinoza Navarro[es], working with other Quechua-speaking artists, founded the Academia de la Lengua Quechua (Academy of the Quechua Language). The Academy argued that Qhapaq Simi, translated as Cusco Quechua, "Imperial Quechua,"  or "Inka Quechua," was the purest form of Quechua and should be taught in Quechua language schools; they rejected the Runa Simi that was spoken in everyday life. On December 10, 1958, the government of Manuel Prado Ugarteche officially recognized the organization, under the name Academia Peruana de la Lengua Quechua (Peruvian Academy of the Quechua Language).

On May 27, 1975, the government of Juan Velasco Alvarado made Quechua an official language of Peru. The law establishing its official status prescribed the five-vowel system; in 1983, professional Quechua and Aymara experts from all over Peru decided to implement an orthography with just three vowels: a, i, and u. This decision was controversial, with factions of linguists both supporting it and opposing it. The Academy did not approve of the shift, and continues to use the five-vowel system.

In 1990, Law Number 25260 established a Quechua language academy in Cusco. Although the law did not mention the name "High Academy of the Quecha Language," the law marked the beginning of the AMLQ's transition to its modern form, culminating in the creation of its guiding statutes in 2009.

The Institution 
The Higher Academy was created on June 8th, 1990, by {Law Number 252620}, which establishes there should be a Quechua language academy in Cusco, without referring exclusively to the AMLQ. On the other hand, the commission to establish the statutes was not created until 2009, although it had been recognized as a decentralized organization in 2007.

The mission of the institution is to ensure the purity of the Quechua language, to stimulate development of literature in this language and the linguistic study.

The Higher Academy of the Quechua Language follows utilizing the Peruvian Quechua version of the alphabet from 1976 with five vowels. Because of this, it writes Qosqo and not Qusqu for "Cusco." According to the AMLQ, Presidential Resolution No. 001 from the 12th of October in 1990 "ratifies the Basic Imperial Quechua Alphabet of 1975 composed of 31 graphemes: five vowels and 26 consonants from Qosqo Puno."

David Samanez Florez from the AMLQ to this day tries to demonstrate the cusqueño origins of the Quechua language even though, according to investigations by Parker (1963) and Torero (1964), the Quechua languages originated in the Central Sierra of Peru.

Quechua World Congresses 
The Third World Congress of Quechua, Yuyayyaku Wawakuna, was held in Salta in October 2004.At the convention, decisions included tasks of the Academy and its affiliates, such as putting in pace the original phonetics and phonology of Quechua phytonyms, zoonyms, anthroponyms and toponyms, coordinating with political and tourist authorities; recommending that its affiliates share publications related to the language, so that the institution can archive all works as part of its heritage and recommend that the Academy should have an organizational characteristic of Andean culture. The institution sought to avoid using models of foreign academies and instead wanted to create their own organizational model

In November 2020, the Fourth World Congress of Quechua, called "Pachakutip K'anchaynin" ("New times of prosperity and change are shining on us") was held in Cochabamba, Bolivia.

Criticism 

 The AMLQ is often criticized for its tendency towards linguistic purism.

 In 2006, a group of people linked to the institution vandalized a Wikipedia page about Southern Quechua, insulting its editors and defacing its title page.
 In 2010, four workers of the institution began a hunger strike, claiming the statutes were outdated and the budget was too low. While the budget was initially granted, the Ministry of Education never followed through due to the AMLQ's own issues within self-regulation.

 According to Godenzzi, the intent of the academy is to create a "norm" among the languages. According to Tim Marr, the extensive setbacks overtime have been result of Andean fascism.

References

External links 

 
A critical analysis by a sociolinguist of the motivation behind the AMLQ's positions, and whether they are helpful to Quechua, or counterproductive.
Another linguist's experiences, both positive and negative, of working with the AMLQ.
The Politics of Quechua: student research in Cusco, Peru
Traslate-quechua online Translate online quechua to/from English, Spanish, Italian, Chinese, Arabian etc.

Publicacions 
AMLQ (Academia Mayor de la Lengua Quechua) y Municipalidad del Qosqo (1995): Diccionario Quechua-Español-Quechua/Qheswa-Español-Qheswa Simi Taqe. Cusco. Online version (pdf 7,68 MB).

Cultural organisations based in Peru
Southern Quechua